IBM ILOG CPLEX Optimization Studio (often informally referred to simply as CPLEX) is an optimization software package.  In 2004, the work on CPLEX earned the first INFORMS Impact Prize.

History 
The CPLEX Optimizer was named for the simplex method as implemented in the C programming language, although today it also supports other types of mathematical optimization and offers interfaces other than C.  It was originally developed by Robert E. Bixby and sold commercially from 1988 by CPLEX Optimization Inc. This was acquired by ILOG in 1997 and ILOG was subsequently acquired by IBM in January 2009.  CPLEX continues to be actively developed by IBM.

Features 
The IBM ILOG CPLEX Optimizer solves integer programming problems, very large linear programming problems using either primal or dual variants of the simplex method or the barrier interior point method, convex and non-convex quadratic programming problems, and convex quadratically constrained problems (solved via second-order cone programming, or SOCP).

The CPLEX Optimizer has a modeling layer called Concert that provides interfaces to the C++, C#, and Java languages.  There is a Python language interface based on the C interface.  Finally, a stand-alone Interactive Optimizer executable is provided for debugging and other purposes.

The CPLEX Optimizer is accessible through independent modeling systems such as AIMMS, AMPL, GAMS, OptimJ and TOMLAB. In addition to that AMPL provides an interface to the CPLEX CP Optimizer.

The full IBM ILOG CPLEX Optimization Studio consists of the CPLEX Optimizer for mathematical programming, the CP Optimizer for constraint programming, the Optimization Programming Language (OPL), and a tightly integrated IDE.

Release history 
Prior to IBM acquiring ILOG, the CPLEX team published a release history of CPLEX.

See also 
 FICO Xpress
 GLPK
 SCIP

References

External links

 
 
 
 Free preview edition of IBM ILOG CPLEX Optimization Studio
 IBM ILOG Optimization Forums

Mathematical optimization software
IBM software